Chang Chu-Han (born 1 March 1993) is a Taiwanese slalom canoeist who has competed at the international level since 2008. She is from Taichung and has studied at National Taichung University of Education.

Career 
Chu-Han won a bronze and a silver medal in the K1 event at the 2018 and 2014 Asian Games, respectively. She has also won four medals at the Asian Canoeing Championships. Chang finished in 33rd place at the 2014 U23 World Championships in Penrith.

She earned her best senior world championship result, of 46th, at the 2019 World Championships in La Seu d'Urgell. As there were no eligible athletes left for the Oceania quota, it was reallocated to Chinese Taipei, as the 19th-ranked eligible NOC at the worlds. Chu-Han competed in the K1 event at the 2020 Summer Olympics in Tokyo, where she finished 26th after being eliminated in the heats.

References

External links 
 

1993 births
Living people
Taiwanese female canoeists
Olympic canoeists of Taiwan
Canoeists at the 2020 Summer Olympics
Asian Games medalists in canoeing
Asian Games silver medalists for Chinese Taipei
Asian Games bronze medalists for Chinese Taipei
Canoeists at the 2010 Asian Games
Canoeists at the 2014 Asian Games
Canoeists at the 2018 Asian Games
Sportspeople from Taichung
Medalists at the 2014 Asian Games
Medalists at the 2018 Asian Games